Goldie Jeanne Hawn (born November 21, 1945) is an American actress, dancer, producer and singer. She rose to fame on the NBC sketch comedy program Rowan & Martin's Laugh-In (1968–1970), before going on to receive the Academy Award and Golden Globe Award for Best Supporting Actress for her performance in Cactus Flower (1969).

Hawn appeared in such films as There's a Girl in My Soup (1970), Butterflies Are Free (1972), The Sugarland Express (1974), Shampoo (1975), Foul Play (1978), Seems Like Old Times (1980), and Private Benjamin (1980), for which she was nominated for the Academy Award for Best Actress for playing the title role. She later starred in Overboard (1987), Bird on a Wire (1990), Death Becomes Her (1992), Housesitter (1992), The First Wives Club (1996), The Out-of-Towners (1999), and The Banger Sisters (2002). Hawn made her return to film with roles in Snatched (2017), The Christmas Chronicles (2018), and The Christmas Chronicles 2 (2020).

Hawn is the mother of actors Oliver Hudson, Kate Hudson and Wyatt Russell, and has been in a relationship with Kurt Russell since 1983. In 2003, she founded The Hawn Foundation, which educates underprivileged children.

Early life
Hawn was born in Washington, D.C. to Laura (née Steinhoff), a jewelry shop/dance school owner, and Edward Rutledge Hawn, a band musician who played at major events in Washington. She was named after her mother's aunt. She has one sister, entertainment publicist Patti Hawn; their brother, Edward Jr., died in infancy before Patti was conceived. The girls were unaware of their deceased brother's existence growing up.

Her father was a Presbyterian of German and English descent. Her mother was Jewish, the daughter of immigrants from Hungary Hawn was raised Jewish in Takoma Park, Maryland, and attended Montgomery Blair High School in nearby Silver Spring, Maryland.

Hawn began taking ballet and tap dance lessons at the age of three and danced in the corps de ballet of the Ballets Russes de Monte Carlo production of The Nutcracker in 1955. She made her stage debut in 1964, playing Juliet in a Virginia Shakespeare Festival production of Romeo and Juliet.

In 1964, Hawn ran and taught in a ballet school, having dropped out of American University where she was majoring in drama. She made her professional dancing debut in a production of Can-Can at the Texas Pavilion of the New York World's Fair. She began working as a professional dancer a year later and appeared as a go-go dancer in New York City and at the Peppermint Box in New Jersey.

Career

1960s

Hawn moved to California to dance in a show at Melodyland Theatre, a theater in the round across from Disneyland, joining the chorus of Pal Joey and How to Succeed in Business Without Really Trying during the June 14 to September 1966 season. Hawn began her acting career as a cast member of the short-lived sitcom Good Morning World during the 1967–1968 television season, her role being that of the girlfriend of a radio disc jockey, with a stereotypical "dumb blonde" personality.

Her next role, which brought her to international attention, was also as a dumb blonde, as one of the regular cast members on the 1968–1973 sketch comedy show Rowan & Martin's Laugh-In. On the show, she often broke out into high-pitched giggles in the middle of a joke, then delivered a polished performance a moment after. Noted equally for her chipper attitude as for her bikini-attired and painted body, Hawn was seen as a 1960s "It" girl.

Her Laugh-In persona was parlayed into three popular film appearances in the late 1960s and early 1970s: Cactus Flower, There's a Girl in My Soup, and Butterflies Are Free. Hawn made her film debut in a bit role as a giggling dancer in the 1968 film The One and Only, Genuine, Original Family Band, in which she was billed as "Goldie Jeanne", but in her first major film role, in Cactus Flower (1969), she won an Academy Award for Best Supporting Actress as Walter Matthau's suicidal fiancée. The same year, she appeared in The Spring Thing, a television special hosted by Bobbie Gentry and Noel Harrison. Other guests were Meredith MacRae, Irwin C. Watson, Rod McKuen, Shirley Bassey and Harpers Bizarre.

1970s

After Hawn's Academy Award win, her film career took off. She starred in a string of above average and successful comedies starting with There's a Girl in My Soup (1970), $ (1971), and Butterflies Are Free (1972). She continued proving herself in the dramatic league in 1974 with the satirical dramas The Girl from Petrovka and Steven Spielberg's theatrical debut The Sugarland Express. She then co-starred in Hal Ashby's classic satire Shampoo (1975). She also hosted two television specials: Pure Goldie in 1971 and The Goldie Hawn Special in 1978. The latter was a sort of comeback for Hawn, who had been out of the spotlight for two years since the 1976 release of the romantic comedy western The Duchess and the Dirtwater Fox, while she was focusing on her marriage and the birth of her son.

On the special she performed show tunes and comedy bits alongside comic legend George Burns, teen matinee idol Shaun Cassidy, television star John Ritter (during his days on Three's Company), and even the Harlem Globetrotters joined her for a montage. The special later went on to be nominated for a primetime Emmy. Four months later the film Foul Play (with Chevy Chase), was released and became a box office smash, reviving Hawn's film career. The plot centered around an innocent woman in San Francisco who becomes mixed up in an assassination plot.

Hawn's next film, Mario Monicelli's Lovers and Liars (1979), was a box office bomb.

In 1972, Hawn recorded and released a solo country LP for Warner Brothers, titled Goldie. It was recorded with the help of Dolly Parton and Buck Owens. AllMusic gives the album a favorable review, calling it a "sweetly endearing country-tinged middle of the road pop record".

1980s

Hawn's popularity continued into the 1980s, starting with another primetime variety special alongside actress and singer Liza Minnelli, Goldie and Liza Together (1980), which was nominated for four Emmy Awards. In the same year, Hawn took the lead role in Private Benjamin, a comedy she co-produced with her friend Nancy Meyers, who co-wrote the script. Meyers recalls Hawn's reaction when she first described the idea for the story with Hawn as its lead:

Private Benjamin also stars Eileen Brennan and Armand Assante and garnered Hawn her second Academy Award nomination, this time for Best Actress. Hawn's box office success continued with comedies like Seems Like Old Times (1980), written by Neil Simon; Best Friends (1982), written by Valerie Curtin and Barry Levinson; Protocol (1984), co-written by Nancy Meyers; Wildcats (1986)—Hawn also served as executive producer on the latter two; and the World War II romantic drama Swing Shift (1984).

At the age of thirty-nine, Hawn posed for the cover of Playboy January 1985 issue and was the subject of the Playboy Interview. Her last film of the 1980s was opposite partner Kurt Russell, for the third time, in the comedy Overboard (1987).

1990s
In 1990, she starred in the action comedy Bird on a Wire, a critically panned but commercially successful picture that paired Hawn with Mel Gibson. Hawn had mixed success in the early 1990s, with the thriller Deceived (1991), the drama CrissCross and opposite Bruce Willis and Meryl Streep in Death Becomes Her (both 1992). Earlier that year, she starred in Housesitter, a screwball comedy with Steve Martin, which was a commercial success.

Hawn was absent from the screen for four years while caring for her mother, who died of cancer in 1994. Hawn made her entry back into film as producer of the satirical comedy Something to Talk About starring Julia Roberts and Dennis Quaid and made her directorial debut in the television film Hope (1997) starring Christine Lahti and Jena Malone.
Hawn returned to the screen again in 1996 as the aging, alcoholic actress Elise Elliot in the financially and critically successful The First Wives Club, opposite Bette Midler and Diane Keaton, with whom she covered the Lesley Gore hit "You Don't Own Me" for the film's soundtrack. Hawn also performed a cover version of the Beatles' song, "A Hard Day's Night", on George Martin's 1998 album, In My Life.

She also starred in Woody Allen's musical Everyone Says I Love You (1996) and reunited with Steve Martin for the comedy The Out-of-Towners (1999), a remake of the 1970 Neil Simon hit. The film was critically panned and was not successful at the box office. In 1997, Hawn, along with her co-stars from The First Wives Club, Diane Keaton and Bette Midler, received the Women in Film Crystal Awards.

In 1999, she was awarded Hasty Pudding Woman of the Year.

2000s
In 2001, Hawn was reunited with former co-stars Warren Beatty (her co-star in $ and Shampoo) and Diane Keaton for the comedy Town & Country, a critical and financial fiasco. Budgeted at an estimated US$90 million, the film opened to little notice and grossed only $7 million in its North American theatrical release. In 2002, she starred in The Banger Sisters, opposite Susan Sarandon and Geoffrey Rush, her last live action film for fifteen years. In 2005 Hawn's autobiography, A Lotus Grows in the Mud, was published.

2010s
In 2013, Hawn guest-starred, along with Gordon Ramsay, in an episode of Phineas and Ferb, in which she provided the voice of neighbor Peggy McGee. In 2017, Hawn returned to the big screen for the first time since 2002, co-starring with Amy Schumer in the comedy Snatched, playing mother and daughter. In 2018, Hawn cameoed as Mrs. Claus in the Netflix film The Christmas Chronicles. She played Mrs. Claus again, in a leading role, in its 2020 sequel The Christmas Chronicles 2.

Personal life
Hawn has studied meditation. In a 2012 interview, she stated, "I don't think of myself as a Buddhist. I was born Jewish, and I consider that my religion." She also stated, "It's not the idea of a particular religion that's important; it's the development of a spiritual life."

Hawn is a supporter of the LGBT community. Speaking on nations such as Nigeria and others which have criminalized gay people, she denounced these laws, stating, "This is man's inhumanity to man, of the first order."

Marriages and relationships
Hawn's pre-fame boyfriends included actor Mark Goddard and singer Spiro Venduras. They married on May 16, 1969, in Honolulu, Hawaii and separated on April 9, 1973. Hawn then dated stuntman Ted Grossman, Swedish actor Bruno Wintzell and Italian actor Franco Nero, but did not file for divorce from Trikonis until New Year's Eve 1975, after becoming engaged to musician Bill Hudson of the Hudson Brothers, whom she’d met the previous summer on a first-class flight from New York to Los Angeles. Hawn was granted a divorce in June 1976 and married Hudson on July 3, 1976, in Takoma Park, Maryland. They had two children, son Oliver (born September 7, 1976) and daughter Kate (born April 19, 1979). Hudson filed for divorce on August 15, 1980. Hawn subsequently had a romance with French actor Yves Rénier. The divorce from Hudson was finalized in March 1982.

Hawn has been in a relationship with Kurt Russell since Valentine's Day 1983. The couple first met while filming The One and Only, Genuine, Original Family Band in 1966, but became involved after reconnecting on the set of Swing Shift. They have a son, Wyatt (born July 10, 1986). In 2000 and again in 2004, news outlets reported that Hawn and Russell were on the verge of breaking up. During the alleged separations, Hawn was linked to newsman Charles Glass and Pakistani cricketer and Prime Minister of Pakistan Imran Khan. Hawn and Russell, who celebrated 35 years together in 2018, own homes in Vancouver, Snowmass, Manhattan, Santa Ynez Valley, Brentwood; and Palm Desert. Hawn has revealed that she has no plans to marry Russell, stating that she "would have been long divorced if [she'd] been married," and that she and Russell chose to stay together and they do not feel that marriage "cements" a relationship.

The Hawn Foundation
In 2003, Hawn founded the Hawn Foundation, a non-profit organization which provides youth education programs intended to improve academic performance through "life-enhancing strategies for well-being". The Hawn Foundation has supported research studies conducted by external researchers to evaluate the effectiveness of its educational program for children, called MindUP.

Filmography

Film

Television

Other

Discography

Albums
 1972, Goldie, Reprise Records: MS 2061

Singles
1972, "Pitta Patta", Reprise Records: REP 1126 (directed by Van Dyke Parks)
1997, "You Don't Own Me", Columbia Records: XPCD842 (with Bette Midler and Diane Keaton)
1972, "Carey", Reprise Records: K14211 U.K Issue

Awards and nominations

References

Further reading

External links

 
 
 Goldie Hawn at discogs.com
 The Hawn Foundation
 Goldie Hawn interview on BBC Radio 4 Desert Island Discs, September 23, 2012

Videos
"Hawn: From 'Cactus Flower' to 'Lotus'" USA Today (May 4, 2005)
"Goldie Hawn a Wallflower?"  60 Minutes. CBS News (May 1, 2005)

1945 births
Living people
20th-century American actresses
20th-century American Jews
20th-century American singers
20th-century American women singers
21st-century American actresses
21st-century American Jews
Actresses from Maryland
Actresses from Washington, D.C.
American female dancers
American film actresses
American memoirists
American musical theatre actresses
American people of English descent
American people of German descent
American people of Hungarian-Jewish descent
American sketch comedians
American stage actresses
American television actresses
American women memoirists
Best Supporting Actress Academy Award winners
Best Supporting Actress Golden Globe (film) winners
Hudson family (show business)
Jewish American actresses
Jewish singers
American LGBT rights activists
People from Silver Spring, Maryland
People from Takoma Park, Maryland
Singers from Maryland
Singers from Washington, D.C.